

Portugal
Angola 
 Military junta (1822–1823)
 Cristóvão Avelino Dias, Governor of Angola (1823)
 Nicolau Aberu Castelo Branco, Governor of Angola (1823–1829)

Spanish Empire
Captaincy General of Cuba – 
Sebastián Kindelán y Oregón, Provisional Governor of Cuba (1822–1823)
Francisco Dionisio Vives, Governor of Cuba (1823–1832)
Captaincy General of Puerto Rico – Miguel de la Torre y Pando, conde de Torrepando, Governor of Puerto Rico (1822–1837)
Spanish East Indies – Juan Antonio Martínez, Governor-General of the Philippines (1822–1825) 
Viceroyalty of Peru – José de la Serna e Hinojosa, 1st Count of los Andes, Viceroy of Peru (1821–1824)

United Kingdom
 Malta Colony – Thomas Maitland, Governor of Malta (1813–1824)
New South Wales – Major-General Thomas Brisbane, Governor of New South Wales (1821–1825)

Colonial governors
Colonial governors
1823